Tamás Takács (born 5 September 1979 in Szombathely, Hungary) is a Hungarian football player who currently plays for Lombard-Pápa TFC

Career in NB I
Tamás Takács has played in 105 matches in the Hungarian First Division.

References
UEFA Under 21 history 2002
UEFA Under 21 history 2002
UEFA Under 21 history 2003
Brugge claim slender advantange.
Mission accomplished for solid Brugge

External links
www.eufo.de
www.hlsz.hu

1979 births
Living people
Sportspeople from Szombathely
Hungarian footballers
Association football goalkeepers
Szombathelyi Haladás footballers
Debreceni VSC players
Diósgyőri VTK players
Budapest Honvéd FC players
FC Sopron players
Nyíregyháza Spartacus FC players
CF Liberty Oradea players
Lombard-Pápa TFC footballers
Hungarian expatriate footballers
Expatriate footballers in Romania
Hungarian expatriate sportspeople in Romania